Yakmesi was according to the Assyrian King List (AKL) the 22nd Assyrian monarch, ruling in Assyria's early period. Yakmesi is listed within a section of the AKL as the sixth out of the ten, "kings whose fathers are known". This section (which in contrast to the rest of the list) had been written in reverse order—beginning with Aminu and ending with Apiashal “altogether ten kings who are ancestors""—and has often been interpreted as the list of ancestors of the Amorite Šamši-Adad I (fl. c. 1809 BCE) who had conquered the city-state of Aššur. The AKL also states that Yakmesi had been both the son and successor of Ilu-Mer. Additionally, the AKL states that Yakmesi had been both the predecessor and father of Yakmeni.

See also

 Timeline of the Assyrian Empire
 Early Period of Assyria
 List of Assyrian kings
 Assyrian continuity
 Assyrian people
 Assyria

References

22nd-century BC Assyrian kings